Evangelos Apostolou (born 28 May 1949 on the island of Euboea) is a Greek Syriza politician who served as the Minister of Agricultural Development and Food in the Second Cabinet of Alexis Tsipras from September 2015 to August 2018. From January to August 2015, he served as the Alternate Minister of Agricultural Development and Food in the First Cabinet of Alexis Tsipras.

Early life and education
Born 1949 in Pappades, near Agia Anna, Euboea, Apostolou studied forestry at Aristotle University of Thessaloniki.

Political career
As a member of Synaspismos, Apostolou has been a Member of the Hellenic Parliament for Euboea in the 1996–2000 period and served as a member of Synaspismos' Political Secretariat from 2004 until 2010.

Following his party into the Coalition of the Radical Left (SYRIZA), he was elected again in the May 2012 and June 2012 elections and named Syriza's shadow minister of rural development in July 2012. After the January 2015 legislative election, Apostolou was appointed Deputy Minister of Agricultural Development and Food.

References

External links
 

1949 births
Living people
Aristotle University of Thessaloniki alumni
Forestry academics
Coalition of Left, of Movements and Ecology politicians
Greek MPs 1996–2000
Syriza politicians
Greek MPs 2012 (May)
Greek MPs 2012–2014
Greek MPs 2015 (February–August)
Agriculture ministers of Greece
Government ministers of Greece
Greek MPs 2015–2019

People from Euboea (regional unit)
Greek MPs 2019–2023